Stary Wielisław  is a village in the administrative district of Gmina Kłodzko, within Kłodzko County, Lower Silesian Voivodeship, in south-western Poland.

Local landmarks are the Shrine of Our Lady of Sorrows and the chapel mausoleum of Duke John I of Ziębice from the Piast dynasty, who died in the vicinity of the village during a battle against the Hussites in 1428.

Transport
There is a train station in the village.

References

Villages in Kłodzko County